Körslaget 2008 was the first season of the Swedish TV entertainment program Körslaget, based on Clash of the Choirs and broadcast on TV4. The first season was shown in spring 2008 and consisted of eight sections, and from the second section, a choir was voted out in each section. The show premiered 29 March and the finale aired 10 May, which was won by Team Cans.

The show's host for the first season was Gry Forssell. Seven artists were commissioned to gather seven singers for their choirs from their respective home towns and compete with them against the other performers' choirs. No one was eliminated during the first episode. Instead, the votes for that episode were included in episode 2. Team Linda and Team Markoolio got the fewest votes. Eliminations started on the second episode. The first choir to be eliminated was Team Siw, led by Siw Malmkvist . Thereafter, the eliminations were (in order): Team Agnes, led by Agnes Carlsson, Team Markoolio, led by Markoolio, Team Linda, led by Linda Bengtzing and Team Lotta, led by Lotta Engberg. The winners were Team Cans, led by Joacim Cans and Team Brolle, led by Brolle were the runners-up.

Contestants
Joacim Cans With a choir from Mora - Winner
Brolle With a choir from Boden - Eliminated 10 May
Lotta Engberg With a choir from Laxå - Eliminated 3 May
Linda Bengtzing With a choir from Gullspång - Eliminated 26 April
Markoolio With a choir from Orminge - Eliminated 19 April
Agnes Carlsson With a choir from Vänersborg - Eliminated 12 April
Siw Malmkvist With a choir from Landskrona - Eliminated 5 April

Episode 1
 Team Linda - Like a Prayer (Madonna)
 Team Siw - Bra Vibrationer (Kikki Danielsson)
 Team Brolle - If I Could Turn Back Time (Cher)
 Team Agnes - Big Girl (You Are Beautiful) (Mika)
 Team Cans - You Give Love a Bad Name (Bon Jovi)
 Team Lotta - Let's Twist Again (Chubby Checker)
 Team Markoolio - Rock Your Body (Justin Timberlake)

Fewest votes

 Team Linda
 Team Markoolio

Episode 2
 Team Cans - We Will Rock You (Queen)
 Team Lotta - Hooked on a Feeling (Björn Skifs)
 Team Markoolio - Pride (In The Name Of Love) (U2)
 Team Linda - You're the Voice (John Farnham)
 Team Siw - Money, Money, Money, (ABBA)
 Team Brolle - Suspicious Minds (Elvis Presley)
 Team Agnes - I Am Outta Love (Anastacia)

Fewest Votes

 Team Siw
 Team Linda

Episode 3
 Team Agnes - It's Raining Men (The Weather Girls)
 Team Cans - Love In An Elevator (Aerosmith)
 Team Linda - Vi är på gång (Tomas Ledin)
 Team Markoolio - I Want You Back (Jackson 5)
 Team Lotta - The Lion Sleeps Tonight (The Tokens)
 Team Brolle - It's My Life (Bon Jovi)

Fewst Votes

 Team Agnes
 Team Markoolio

Episode 4
 Team Markoolio - Värsta Schlagern (Linda Bengtzning och Markoolio)
 Team Brolle - Watching The Stars (Brolle)
 Team Linda - Hur svårt kan det va (Linda Bengtzning)
 Team Lotta - La Det Swinge (Bobbysocks)
 Team Cans - Hearts On Fire (Hammerfall)

Fewest votes

 Team Markoolio
 Team Linda

Episode 5
Round 1

 Team Lotta - Grease Lightning (Grease)
 Team Cans - You Shook Me All Night Long (AC/DC)
 Team Linda - Satellit (Ted Gärdestad)
 Team Brolle - I Would Do Anything For Love (Meat Loaf)

Round 2

 Team Lotta - Don't Worry Be Happy (Bobby McFerrin)
 Team Brolle - Ring Of Fire (Johnny Cash)
 Team Linda - Goodnight Sweetheart Goodnight (The McGuire Sisters)
 Team Cans - O Fortuna (Carmina Burana)

Minst röster

 Team Linda
 Team Lotta

Episode 6
Round 1

 Team Cans - Pour Some Sugar On Me (Def Leppard)
 Team Lotta - Thriller (Michael Jackson)
 Team Brolle - Burning Love (Elvis Presley)

Round 2

 Team Cans - Livin La Vida Loca (Ricky Martin)
 Team Brolle - Eloise (Arvingarna)
 Team Lotta - Run To The Hills (Iron Maiden)

Fewest Votes

 Team Lotta
 Team Cans

Program 7 (Final)
Round 1 (Own choice)

 Team Brolle - Think (Aretha Franklin)
 Team Cans - Bohemian Rhapsody (Queen)

Round 2 (Viewers choice)

 Team Brolle - Suspicious Minds (Elvis Presley)
 Team Cans - O Fortuna (Carmina Burana)

Round 3 (Shared Song)

 Team Brolle - Livin on a prayer (Bon Jovi)
 Team Cans - Livin on a prayer (Bon Jovi)

Winner:
Team Cans

Elimination chart

TV4 (Sweden) original programming
2008 Swedish television seasons